Vitex agnus-castus, also called vitex,  chaste tree (or chastetree), chasteberry, Abraham's balm, lilac chastetree, or monk's pepper, is a native of the Mediterranean region. It is one of the few temperate-zone species of Vitex, which is on the whole a genus of tropical and subtropical flowering plants. Theophrastus mentioned the shrub several times, as agnos (άγνος) in Enquiry into Plants. It has been long believed to be an anaphrodisiac – leading to its name as chaste tree – but its effectiveness for such action remains unproven.

Vitex is a cross-pollinating plant, but its self-pollination has been recorded.

Etymology and common names
Vitex, its name in Pliny the Elder, is derived from the Latin vieo, meaning to weave or to tie up, a reference to the use of Vitex agnus-castus in basketry. Its macaronic specific name agnus-castus repeats "chaste" in both Greek and Latin; the small tree was considered to be sacred to the virginal goddess Hestia/Vesta. The most common names are "chaste tree", "vitex", and "monk's pepper".

Description

Vitex agnus-castus is widely cultivated in warm temperate and subtropical regions for its delicate-textured, aromatic foliage and butterfly-attracting midsummer spikes of lavender flowers opening in late summer in cooler climates. It requires full sun, though tolerates partial shade, along with well-drained soil. Under ideal conditions, it is hardy to  USDA Zone 6, and can be found as far north as the south shore of Long Island and Nantucket on the East Coast of the United States and in the mild southwest of England. In colder zones, the plant tends to die back to the ground, but as it flowers on new wood, flowering is not affected on vigorous growth in the following season. This plant is a brackish water dweller, indicating that it tolerates salt. Cold and wet weather results in dieback and losses. The plant grows well on loamy neutral to alkaline soil.

In cultivation in the UK,  the form Vitex agnus-castus f. latifolia has gained the Royal Horticultural Society’s Award of Garden Merit.

The fruits from one single tree can be harvested for more than 15 years. This indicates that the tree cannot be integrated in a usual crop rotation system. It is suggested to sow dissimilar plants such as monocots as its subsequent crop so that it might be easier to control the monk's pepper plant, the dicot. Because the fruits of monk's pepper tend to fall constantly and uncontrollably, the plant likely can germinate from seed. Pruning back the branches in autumn has a positive influence on fruit yield while repruning in spring can induce an increase of vegetative shoots and thus a fruit yield loss.

Reproduction
This plant can also be reproduced vegetatively. One possibility is to use  pieces of the ripening wood with buds in July or August and another is to cut the ripe wood in November and then let it root in a coldframe. Also in vitro reproduction with spike of the shoots or node explants is possible.

Harvest
The flowering and ripening processes do not happen simultaneously, enabling harvesting of both fresh fruits and seeds over a long span of time. The fruits tend to fall from the plant as they ripen, getting lost in the soil. Thus, it has no optimal fixed harvest time. Consequently, to avoid yield loss, unripe fruits need to be harvested. This early harvesting has no effect on quality. Overall, harvesting the fruits by hand likely is the most convenient solution.

Diseases and pests
Thysanoptera, also known as thrips, can cause great damage to the growth and the generative development of V. agnus-castus. The insect feeds on chaste tree by sucking up the fruit contents or puncturing them. Also, chaste tree is the only known host (especially in Israel) for Hyalesthus obsoletus. This cicada is the vector for black wood disease of grapevines. H. obsoletus prefers V. agnus-castus  as a host to the grapevine. In this case, chaste trees can be used as a biological control agent by planting them around vineyards to trap the H. obsoletus.
V. agnus-castus was found not only to be an appropriate food source for the adult vectors, but also a reservoir of Candidatus phytoplasma solani (bacterial Phytoplasma species), the causal agent of the black wood disease in grapevines. 
The pathogen-caused leaf spot disease can almost defoliate V. agnus castus. Furthermore, root rot can occur when soils are kept too moist.

Chemical compounds
Flavonoids (vitexin, casticin), iridoid glycoside (agnuside, aucubin), p-hydroxybenzoic acid, alkaloids, essential oils, fatty oils, diterpenoids and steroids have been identified in the chemical analysis of V. agnus-castus. They occur in the fruits and in the leaves.

Essential oils
Essential oils have been found in the fruits and in the leaves. The oil of leaves, unripe, and ripe fruits differ in compounds; 50 compounds were identified in the oil of unripe fruits, 51 compounds in the oil of ripe fruits, and 46 compounds in the oil of the leaves. 1,8-Cineole and sabinene are the main monoterpene components and beta-caryophyllene is the major sesquiterpene compound found in the fruits of V. agnus-castus. Some slight differences occur between fruits from white-flowering plants compared to violet-flowering ones. The oil of fruits of former has a higher amount of monoterpene constituents. The leaves mainly contain 1,8-cineole, trans-beta-farnesene, alpha-pinene, trans-beta-caryophyllene, and terpinen-4-ol. The oil, particularly from white-flowering plants, is under preliminary research for its potential antibacterial effects.

Herbal uses
The leaves and tender stem growth of the upper , along with the flowers and ripening seeds, are harvested for alternative medicinal purposes. The berries are believed to be a tonic herb for both the male and female reproductive systems. The leaves are believed to have the same effect, but to a lesser degree. The leaves, flowers, and/or berries may be consumed as a decoction, traditional tincture, cider-vinegar tincture, syrup, or elixir, or simply eaten from the plant with presumed benefits as food. A popular way of taking Vitex is on awakening as a simple 1:1 fluid extract, which is said to interact with hormonal circadian rhythms most effectively.

In ancient times, it was believed to be an anaphrodisiac, hence the name chaste tree. Pliny, in his Historia Naturalis, reported the use of stems and leaves of this plant by women as bedding "to cool the heat of lust" during the time of the Thesmophoria, when Athenian women left their husbands to remain ritually chaste. At the end of the 14th century, John Trevisa reported of it, "the herbe agnus-castus is always grene, and the flowre therof is namly callyd Agnus Castus, for wyth smel and vse it maketh men chaste as a lombe".  In the 15th-century poem The Flower and the Leaf, it is referred to as an attribute of the chaste Diana, and in the 16th century, English herbalist William Turner reported the same anaphrodisiac properties of the seed, both fried and not fried.

Traditional medicine
Vitex has been used in traditional medicine for reproductive health issues in women, but no high-quality clinical evidence supports its effectiveness. 

Although vitex is commonly recommended in Germany, Vitex agnus-castus should be avoided during pregnancy due to the possibility of complications.

Safety and adverse effects
Adverse effects from Vitex can include nausea, headache, gastrointestinal discomfort, menstrual discomfort, fatigue, and skin disorders. People taking dopamine-related medications or Parkinson's disease medications should avoid using chasteberry. Women on birth-control pills, hormone-replacement therapy, or having a hormone-sensitive condition, such as breast cancer, are advised not to use chasteberry. Use of vitex is discouraged for pregnant or breastfeeding women, and for children.

References

External links

 Medicine Docs: Vitex agnus-castus (medicinal plant)

agnus-castus
Trees of Europe
Medicinal plants of Europe
Anaphrodisia
Plants described in 1753
Taxa named by Carl Linnaeus
Butterfly food plants
Trees of Mediterranean climate
Garden plants of Europe
Ornamental trees
Flora of the Mediterranean Basin